The 2018 New Hampshire House of Representatives elections took place as part of the biennial United States elections. New Hampshire voters elected all 400 state representatives from 103 districts. State representatives serve two-year terms in the New Hampshire House of Representatives. A primary election on September 11, 2018 determined which candidates appear on the November 6 general election ballot. All the members elected served in the 166th New Hampshire General Court.

Summary of results

Sources

Retiring incumbents
86 incumbent Representatives (54 Republicans and 32 Democrats) did not seek re-election in 2018:

Valerie Fraser (R), Belknap 1
Marc Abear (R), Belknap 3
Norman Silber (R), Belknap 3
Herb Vadney (R), Belknap 3
Stephen Schmidt (R), Carroll 6
Gladys Johnsen (D), Cheshire 7
Marge Shephardson (D), Cheshire 10
Bing Judd (R), Coos 1
Herbert Richardson (R), Coos 4
Skylar Boutin (R), Grafton 2
Travis Bennett (D), Grafton 8
Robert Hull (R), Grafton 9
Patricia Higgins (D), Grafton 12
Andrew White (D), Grafton 13
Brad Bailey (R), Grafton 14
David Binford (R), Grafton 15
Duane Brown (R), Grafton 16
Neal Kurk (R), Hillsborough 2
Jonathan Manley (D), Hillsborough 3
Rick Christie (R), Hillsborough 6
Claire Rouillard (R), Hillsborough 6
Nick Zaricki (R), Hillsborough 6
Terry Wolf (R), Hillsborough 7
Keith Murphy (R), Hillsborough 7
Daniel Sullivan (D), Hillsborough 8
Elizabeth Edwards (D), Hillsborough 11
Richard O'Leary (D), Hillsborough 13
Mark Mackenzie (D), Hillsborough 17
Armand Forest (D), Hillsborough 18
Joel Elber (D), Hillsborough 19
Frank Byron (R), Hillsborough 20
Josh Moore (R), Hillsborough 21
Tony Pellegrino (R), Hillsborough 21
Chris Christensen (R), Hillsborough 21
Shannon Chandley (D), Hillsborough 22
Barbara Biggie (R), Hillsborough 23
Craig Moore (R), Hillsborough 25
John Carr (R), Hillsborough 26
Jan Schmidt (D), Hillsborough 28
Suzanne Harvey (D), Hillsborough 29
Cindy Rosenwald (D), Hillsborough 30
Amelia Keane (D), Hillsborough 31
Jessica Ayala (D), Hillsborough 31
Steve Negron (R), Hillsborough 32
Donald LeBrun (R), Hillsborough 32
David Murotake (R), Hillsborough 32
Timothy Twombly (R), Hillsborough 34
David Lisle (D), Hillsborough 35
Eric Shleien (R), Hillsborough 37
Gregory Smith (R), Hillsborough 37
Richard McNamara (D), Hillsborough 38
Kathleen Souza (R), Hillsborough 43
Ryan Smith (R), Merrimack 3
David Woolpert (D), Merrimack 6
Caroletta Alicea (D), Merrimack 8
Paul Henle (D), Merrimack 12
Linda Kenison (D), Merrimack 15
J.R. Hoell (R), Merrimack 23
Bill Kuch (R), Merrimack 23
Mary Gile (D), Merrimack 27
Jim Nasser (R), Rockingham 2
Carolyn Matthews (R), Rockingham 3
Joseph Hagan (R), Rockingham 4
Kari Lerner (D), Rockingham 4
Bob Rimol (R), Rockingham 5
Martin Bove (R), Rockingham 5
Robert Fesh (R), Rockingham 6
David Bates (R), Rockingham 7
Daniel Itse (R), Rockingham 10
William Friel (R), Rockingham 14
Mary Allen (R), Rockingham 15
Robert Nigrello (R), Rockingham 16
Elizabeth Farnham (D), Rockingham 18
Paula Francese (D), Rockingham 18
Francis Chase (R), Rockingham 20
Mindi Messmer (D), Rockingham 24
Scott Wallace (R), Rockingham 33
Richard Gordon (R), Rockingham 35
John Mullen (R), Strafford 1
Robert Graham (R), Strafford 1
Jackie Cilley (D), Strafford 4
Len Turcotte (R), Strafford 4
Matthew Scruton (R), Strafford 12
Hamilton Krans Jr. (D), Strafford 14
Raymond Gagnon (D), Sullivan 5
James Grenier (R), Sullivan 7

Defeated incumbents

In primary
17 incumbent representatives (11 Republican and 6 Democrats) sought reelection but were defeated in the September 11 primary.

Delmar Burridge (D), Cheshire 16
Vicki Schwaegler (R), Grafton 3
Steven Rand (D), Grafton 8
Daniel Donovan (R), Hillsborough 2
David Pierce (R), Hillsborough 6
Carolyn Gargasz (R), Hillsborough 27
Jesse Martineau (D), Hillsborough 42
Dick Patten (D), Merrimack 17
Michael Brewster (R), Merrimack 21
John Leavitt (R), Merrimack 24
Brian Stone (R), Rockingham 1
Patricia Dowling (R), Rockingham 6
Richard Tripp (R), Rockingham 6
Brenda Willis (R), Rockingham 6
John Manning Jr. (R), Rockingham 8
Wayne Burton (D), Strafford 6
Roger Berube (D), Strafford 18

In general election
42 incumbent representatives (35 Republicans, 5 Democrats and 2 Libertarians) sought reelection but were defeated in the November 6 general election.

Philip Spagnuolo (D), Belknap 3
Gene G. Chandler (R), Carroll 1
Karen Umberger (R), Carroll 2
Frank McCarthy (R), Carroll 2
Mark McConkey (R), Carroll 3
Jim McConnell (R), Cheshire 12
Franklin Sterling (R), Cheshire 14
Robert Theberge (R), Coos 3
Herb Richardson (D), Coos 4
Bonnie Ham (R), Grafton 5
Tiffany Johnson (R), Grafton 7
Stephen Darrow (R), Grafton 17
Glen Dickey (R), Hillsborough 5
Lisa Freeman (R), Hillsborough 12
Victoria Sullivan (R), Hillsborough 16
Peter Hansen (R), Hillsborough 22
Carolyn Halstead (R), Hillsborough 23
Elizabeth Ferreira (R), Hillsborough 28
Carl Siedel (R), Hillsborough 28
Mariellen MacKay (R), Hillsborough 30
Kevin Scully (R), Hillsborough 33
Bill Ohm (R), Hillsborough 36
Caleb Q. Dyer (L), Hillsborough 37
John Valera (R), Hillsborough 38
Keith Ammon (R), Hillsborough 40
Douglas Long (R), Merrimack 4
Michael Moffett (R), Merrimack 9
Natalie Wells (R), Merrimack 25
Frank Sapareto (R), Rockingham 6
Michael Vose (R), Rockingham 9
Allen Cook (R), Rockingham 11
Philip Bean (R), Rockingham 21
Tracy Emerick (R), Rockingham 21
Henry Marsh (R), Rockingham 22
Matthew Spencer (R), Strafford 18
Dale Sprague (D), Strafford 18
Thomas Kaczynski (R), Strafford 22
Brandon Phinney (L), Strafford 24
Sue Gottling (D), Sullivan 2
Francis Gauthier (R), Sullivan 3
John O'Connor (R), Sullivan 4
Virginia Irwin (D), Sullivan 6

Detailed results
Sources

Belknap County

Belknap 1
Elects one representative

Belknap 2
Elects four representatives
Republican primary

General election

Belknap 3
Elects four representatives

Belknap 4
Elects two representatives
Republican primary

Democratic primary

General election

Belknap 5
Elects two representatives

Belknap 6
Elects two representatives

Belknap 7
Elects one representative

Belknap 8
Elects one representative

Belknap 9
Elects one representative

Carroll County

Carroll 1
Elects one representative
Democratic primary

General election

Carroll 2
Elects three representatives

Carroll 3
Elects two representatives

Carroll 4
Elects two representatives
Democratic primary

General election

Carroll 5
Elects three representatives

Carroll 6
Elects two representatives
Republican primary

General election

Carroll 7
Elects one representative

Carroll 8
Elects one representative
Republican primary

General election

Cheshire County

Cheshire 1
Elects four representatives

Cheshire 2
Elects one representative
Republican primary

General election

Cheshire 3
Elects one representative

Cheshire 4
Elects one representative

Cheshire 5
Elects one representative

Cheshire 6
Elects one representative

Cheshire 7
Elects one representative

Cheshire 8
Elects one representative

Cheshire 9
Elects two representatives

Cheshire 10
Elects one representative

Cheshire 11
Elects two representatives

Cheshire 12
Elects two representatives

Cheshire 13
Elects one representative

Cheshire 14
Elects one representative

Cheshire 15
Elects one representative

Cheshire 16
Elects two representatives
Democratic primary

General election

Coös County

Coös 1
Elects two representatives

Coös 2
Elects one representative

Coös 3
Elects three representatives

Coös 4
Elects one representative

Coös 5
Elects one representative

Coös 6
Elects one representative

Coös 7
Elects one representative

Grafton County

Grafton 1
Elects two representatives

Grafton 2
Elects one representative

Grafton 3
Elects one representative
Republican primary

General election

Grafton 4
Elects one representative

Grafton 5
Elects one representative

Grafton 6
Elects one representative

Grafton 7
Elects one representative

Grafton 8
Elects three representatives
Democratic primary

General election

Grafton 9
Elects two representatives
Republican primary

General election

Grafton 10
Elects one representative

Grafton 11
Elects one representative

Grafton 12
Elects four representatives

Grafton 13
Elects four representatives

Grafton 14
Elects one representative

Grafton 15
Elects one representative
Republican primary

General election

Grafton 16
Elects one representative

Grafton 17
Elects one representative

Hillsborough County

Hillsborough 1
Elects two representatives

Hillsborough 2
Elects three representatives
Republican primary

General election

Hillsborough 3
Elects one representative

Hillsborough 4
Elects two representatives

Hillsborough 5
Elects two representatives

Hillsborough 6
Elects five representatives
Republican primary

General election

Hillsborough 7
Elects six representatives
Republican primary

Democratic primary

General election

Hillsborough 8
Elects two representatives
Democratic primary

General election

Hillsborough 9
Elects two representatives
Democratic primary

General election

Hillsborough 10
Elects two representatives

Hillsborough 11
Elects two representatives
Democratic primary

Republican primary

General election

Hillsborough 12
Elects two representatives

Hillsborough 13
Elects two representatives

Hillsborough 14
Elects two representatives
Democratic primary

General election

Hillsborough 15
Elects two representatives

Hillsborough 16
Elects two representatives
Democratic primary

General election

Hillsborough 17
Elects two representatives

Hillsborough 18
Elects two representatives
Democratic primary

General election

Hillsborough 19
Elects two representatives

Hillsborough 20
Elects two representatives
Republican primary

General election

Hillsborough 21
Elects eight representatives

Hillsborough 22
Elects three representatives
Republican primary

General election

Hillsborough 23
Elects four representatives

Hillsborough 24
Elects two representatives
Democratic primary

General election

Hillsborough 25
Elects two representatives

Hillsborough 26
Elects two representatives

Hillsborough 27
Elects two representatives
Republican primary

General election

Hillsborough 28
Elects three representatives

Hillsborough 29
Elects three representatives
Democratic primary

General election

Hillsborough 30
Elects three representatives

Hillsborough 31
Elects three representatives

Hillsborough 32
Elects three representatives
Democratic primary

General election

Hillsborough 33
Elects three representatives

Hillsborough 34
Elects three representatives

Hillsborough 35
Elects three representatives

Hillsborough 36
Elects three representatives

Hillsborough 37
Elects eleven representatives

Hillsborough 38
Elects two representatives

Hillsborough 39
Elects one representative

Hillsborough 40
Elects one representative

Hillsborough 41
Elects one representative

Hillsborough 42
Elects two representatives
Democratic primary

General election

Hillsborough 43
Elects three representatives

Hillsborough 44
Elects two representatives
Republican primary

General election

Hillsborough 45
Elects two representatives
Democratic primary

General election

Merrimack County

Merrimack 1
Elects one representative

Merrimack 2
Elects two representatives

Merrimack 3
Elects two representatives

Merrimack 4
Elects one representative

Merrimack 5
Elects two representatives

Merrimack 6
Elects two representatives

Merrimack 7
Elects one representative

Merrimack 8
Elects one representative
Republican primary

General election

Merrimack 9
Elects two representatives

Merrimack 10
Elects three representatives
Democratic primary

General election

Merrimack 11
Elects one representative

Merrimack 12
Elects one representative

Merrimack 13
Elects one representative

Merrimack 14
Elects one representative
Democratic primary

General election

Merrimack 15
Elects one representative

Merrimack 16
Elects one representative

Merrimack 17
Elects one representative
Democratic primary

General election

Merrimack 18
Elects one representative

Merrimack 19
Elects one representative

Merrimack 20
Elects three representatives

Merrimack 21
Elects two representatives
Republican primary

General election

Merrimack 22
Elects one representative
Democratic primary

Republican primary

General election

Merrimack 23
Elects three representatives
Democratic primary

Republican primary

*Brassard won a tie-breaker.
General election

Merrimack 24
Elects four representatives
Republican primary

General election

Merrimack 25
Elects one representative
Democratic primary

General election

Merrimack 26
Elects one representative

Merrimack 27
Elects two representatives
Democratic primary

General election

Merrimack 28
Elects one representative

Merrimack 29
Elects one representative

Rockingham County

Rockingham 1
Elects one representative
Republican primary

General election

Rockingham 2
Elects three representatives
Republican primary

General election

Rockingham 3
Elects three representatives

Rockingham 4
Elects five representatives
Republican primary

Democratic primary

General election

Rockingham 5
Elects seven representatives

Rockingham 6
Elects ten representatives
Republican primary

General election

Rockingham 7
Elects four representatives
Republican primary

General election

Rockingham 8
Elects nine representatives
Republican primary

Democratic primary

General election

Rockingham 9
Elects two representatives

Rockingham 10
Elects one representative

Rockingham 11
Elects one representative
Republican primary

General election

Rockingham 12
Elects one representative

Rockingham 13
Elects four representatives

Rockingham 14
Elects four representatives

Rockingham 15
Elects one representative
Republican primary

General election

Rockingham 16
Elects one representative

Rockingham 17
Elects three representatives

Rockingham 18
Elects four representatives

Rockingham 19
Elects two representatives

Rockingham 20
Elects three representatives

Rockingham 21
Elects four representatives
Republican primary

General election

Rockingham 22
Elects one representative

Rockingham 23
Elects one representative

Rockingham 24
Elects two representatives

Rockingham 25
Elects one representative

Rockingham 26
Elects one representative

Rockingham 27
Elects one representative

Rockingham 28
Elects one representative

Rockingham 29
Elects one representative

Rockingham 30
Elects one representative

Rockingham 31
Elects one representative

Rockingham 32
Elects one representative

Rockingham 33
Elects one representative

Rockingham 34
Elects one representative
Republican primary

General election

Rockingham 35
Elects one representative

Rockingham 36
Elects one representative

Rockingham 37
Elects one representative

Strafford County

Strafford 1
Elects two representatives

Strafford 2
Elects two representatives

Strafford 3
Elects two representatives

Strafford 4
Elects two representatives

Strafford 5
Elects one representative
Republican primary

General election

Strafford 6
Elects five representatives
Democratic primary

General election

Strafford 7
Elects one representative

Strafford 8
Elects one representative

Strafford 9
Elects one representative

Strafford 10
Elects one representative

Strafford 11
Elects one representative

Strafford 12
Elects one representative

Strafford 13
Elects one representative

Strafford 14
Elects one representative

Strafford 15
Elects one representative

Strafford 16
Elects one representative

Strafford 17
Elects three representatives

Strafford 18
Elects three representatives
Democratic primary

General election

Strafford 19
Elects one representative

Strafford 20
Elects one representative

Strafford 21
Elects one representative

Strafford 22
Elects one representative
Democratic primary

General election

Strafford 23
Elects one representative

Strafford 24
Elects one representative

Strafford 25
Elects one representative

Sullivan County

Sullivan 1
Elects two representatives

Sullivan 2
Elects one representative

Sullivan 3
Elects one representative

Sullivan 4
Elects one representative
Democratic primary

General election

Sullivan 5
Elects one representative

Sullivan 6
Elects two representatives
Democratic primary

General election

Sullivan 7
Elects one representative

Sullivan 8
Elects one representative

Sullivan 9
Elects one representative

Sullivan 10
Elects one representative

Sullivan 11
Elects one representative

See also
United States elections, 2018
United States House of Representatives elections in New Hampshire, 2018
New Hampshire gubernatorial election, 2018

Notes

References

House
New Hampshire House of Representatives
New Hampshire House of Representatives elections